Timothy Williams (born November 12, 1993) is a professional gridiron football defensive end for the BC Lions of the Canadian Football League (CFL). He played college football at Alabama. He was drafted by the Baltimore Ravens in the third round of the 2017 NFL Draft.

Early years
Williams attended Louisiana State University Laboratory School in Baton Rouge, Louisiana. He was rated by Rivals.com as a four-star recruit and committed to the University of Alabama to play college football.

College career
Williams was a backup his first two years at Alabama in 2013 and 2014. He appeared in 19 games, recording eight tackles and 1.5 sacks. As a junior in 2015, Williams appeared in all 15 games and had 19 tackles and 10.5 sacks. He considered entering the 2016 NFL Draft, but decided to return for his senior year.

Professional career
He received an invitation to the 2017 Senior Bowl, along with teammates O. J. Howard, Dalvin Tomlinson, Cole Mazza, Reuben Foster, and Ryan Anderson. Unfortunately, Williams had to pull out of the Senior Bowl due to an elbow injury. Williams received an invitation to the NFL combine as a top linebacker prospect and completed the majority of combine drills, but was unable to perform the bench press due to his elbow injury. On March 8, 2017, Williams participated at Alabama's pro day, along with teammates Jonathan Allen, O.J. Howard, Ryan Anderson, Dalvin Tomlinson, Cole Mazza, Marlon Humphrey, Cam Robinson, ArDarius Stewart, and 18 others. Team representatives and scouts from all 32 NFL teams attended, including head coaches Todd Bowles (Jets), Bill Belichick (Patriots), Pete Carroll (Seahawks), and Steelers' GM Kevin Colbert. Williams opted to stand on his combine performance and only ran positional drills.

Baltimore Ravens
The Baltimore Ravens selected Williams in the third round (78th overall) of the 2017 NFL Draft.

On May 5, 2017, the Baltimore Ravens signed Williams to a four-year, $3.25 million contract with a signing bonus of $856,680.

He competed with Terrell Suggs, Albert McClellan, Matthew Judon, Tyus Bowser, Za'Darius Smith, and Boseko Lokombo throughout training camp for the starting outside linebacker job left by the departure of Elvis Dumervil during free agency. Head coach John Harbaugh named Williams the third weakside linebacker on the Ravens' depth chart behind Terrell Suggs and Za'Darius Smith.

He was unable to play in the Baltimore Ravens' season -opening victory over the Cincinnati Bengals due to an unspecified illness. On September 17, 2017, Williams made his professional regular season debut against the Cleveland Browns and made the first tackle of his career in the Ravens' 24–10 victory. He missed five games (Weeks 6–9) due to a thigh injury. Williams returned during the Ravens' Week 11 contest at the Green Bay Packers and recorded two combined tackles in their 23–0 victory.

On October 1, 2019, Williams was released by the Ravens.

Green Bay Packers
On October 2, 2019, Williams was claimed off waivers by the Green Bay Packers. He was waived on November 5, 2019. Two days later, he was signed to the practice squad. He signed a reserve/future contract with the Packers on January 21, 2020.

Williams was waived on September 5, 2020.

Seattle Seahawks
On September 30, 2020, Williams was signed to the Seattle Seahawks practice squad. He was released on October 13, 2020.

Saskatchewan Roughriders
On January 15, 2021, it was announced that Williams had signed with the Saskatchewan Roughriders. Willliams was released February 21, 2022 without seeing any game action.

NFL career statistics

Personal life
On September 29, 2016, Williams was arrested by Alabama's campus police for a misdemeanor charge of carrying a pistol without a permit. University of Alabama Police Department's report showed that his arrest took place at 1 am in William's vehicle.

References

External links

Saskatchewan Roughriders bio
Alabama Crimson Tide bio

1993 births
Living people
Players of American football from Baton Rouge, Louisiana
American football linebackers
Alabama Crimson Tide football players
Baltimore Ravens players
Green Bay Packers players
Seattle Seahawks players
Saskatchewan Roughriders players